Blue Ridge Summit is an unincorporated community and census-designated place in Franklin County, Pennsylvania, United States, southwest of Gettysburg in the central part of the state, adjoining Pennsylvania's southern border with Maryland. The population of Blue Ridge Summit was 887 at the 2020 census.

The community was the birthplace of Wallis Simpson, the wife of Prince Edward, Duke of Windsor (previously King Edward VIII of the United Kingdom). It is also home to one of the 15 oldest golf courses in the United States. Built before 1885, the Monterey Country Club has served as a summer retreat for many Washingtonians, and American presidents Woodrow Wilson, Calvin Coolidge and Dwight D. Eisenhower all played the Monterey Country Club course.

Geography
Blue Ridge Summit is located in the southeastern corner of Franklin County at the height of land on South Mountain, the northern extension of the Blue Ridge Mountains of Virginia. It is bordered to the east by Adams County, and to the south by Frederick and Washington counties in Maryland. Directly to the south are the communities of Highfield and Cascade in Maryland.

Pennsylvania Route 16 passes through Blue Ridge Summit, leading east down the mountain to Emmitsburg, Maryland, and west downhill to Waynesboro. Monterey Pass is northwest and slightly downhill from the community along PA 16.

Demographics

History 
John Howard McClellan writes about the history of the Blue Ridge Summit region in his book, Blue Ridge Summit: The Beginnings of a Resort Area:

After the introduction of the railroad in 1872, this area grew to become a lively and fashionable vacation community. The railroad ran to Baltimore and many of the city's elite constructed summer houses there, before the advent of air conditioning, to escape the urban heat. The region was in its hey-day at the beginning of the twentieth century. Many Washingtonians also enjoyed the resort, where several posh "boarding houses", precursors of the "Bed and Breakfast", catered to the comfort-seeking elite. It remained a resort area until its decline during the Depression of 1929 and the following years of limited travel during World War II (1939-1945).

Gettysburg Campaign

During the American Civil War, at the time of the Gettysburg Campaign of 1863, there were several cavalry skirmishes in and around Emmitsburg, Maryland - including Fountain Dale, and Monterey Pass.

On June 22, the first skirmish occurred along the Monterey Mountain pass near Blue Ridge Summit. An armed civilian militia encountered a detachment of Confederates under General Albert G. Jenkins. The militia was forced to retreat after a very brief skirmish. General Jenkins and his Confederate troops withdrew toward Hagerstown, joining General Richard S. Ewell, who was advancing with a larger force.

Following the events at the Battle of Gettysburg, the Confederate Army retreated via Emmitsburg. On July 5, General J.E.B. Stuart's soldiers were engaged in some small skirmishes as he made his way back to General Robert E. Lee's army. A mountain swamp at Monterey Pass bogged down Stuart and the Army of Northern Virginia as they retreated. The Monterey Country Club sits upon  that were once part of that swamp.

Other local interest
Former Vice President of the United States Dick Cheney sometimes resided in an underground complex near Blue Ridge Summit on Raven Rock Mountain when he was said to be "at an undisclosed location" in case of an attack on the United States. The complex is most commonly called "Site R", but also Raven Rock Mountain Complex or the Alternate Joint Communications Center, created in 1951 as a command center in the event of attack on Washington, D.C.

Notable people
 William J. Snow, major general in the United States Army
 Birthplace of Wallis Simpson, Duchess of Windsor

References

External links 
"Emmitsburg: The Pivotal Crossroad of the Civil War", Emmitsburg Historical Society.

Census-designated places in Franklin County, Pennsylvania
South Mountain Range (Maryland−Pennsylvania)
Census-designated places in Pennsylvania